Floyd Cornelius Fields (born January 7, 1969) is a former professional American football safety who played three seasons for the San Diego Chargers in the National Football League.

1969 births
Living people
American football safeties
Arizona State Sun Devils football players
San Diego Chargers players
People from Markham, Illinois